Rive is a platforming shoot-em-up game created by the Dutch video game company Two Tribes for PlayStation 4, Microsoft Windows, OS X, Linux and Nintendo Switch, and is the first major release by the company after the company's downsizing and closure of their primary development team in late 2013. The game was unveiled on July 29, 2014, after a long time of quiet development of the game that originated as a 3D shooter for the Nintendo DS in 2005. The game uses the same engine as Toki Tori 2+ and was developed by a three-man core team.

Gameplay
Rive is a classic 2D side-scrolling platformer mixed with shooting elements, with the ability to shoot in full 360 degrees around the player character who gains the ability to "alter the behavior of their robotic enemies by collecting and uploading hacks". The game features a mission system and high scores for players to come back to after completing the game's story.

Development
Rive was originally confirmed to be in development for the Wii U since September 2014, and a demo version was even included in the Wii U eShop's promotional "Nindies@Home" campaign in June 2015. Although the title was originally intended to release in September 2016 on the Wii U alongside other platforms, in an interview with Nintendo Life in July 2016, Two Tribes co-founder Collin van Ginkel expressed scepticism regarding the game's release for the console due to technical difficulties maintaining the title's optimal performance. Van Ginkel added if the Wii U build fails to reach expectations, they would move the title to the upcoming Nintendo Switch, then known as "NX".

In February 2017, Two Tribes confirmed Rive for Nintendo Switch, dropping the Wii U version. The Switch version was developed in collaboration with Engine Software. It includes an exclusive Copilot Mode, which allows two players to control the same ship co-operatively using each Joy-Con, as well as improved performance over the PlayStation 4 version running 60 frames per second at 1080p. The Nintendo Switch version was released on November 17, 2017 worldwide, with 48 additional achievements and HD Rumble support, under the title Rive: Ultimate Edition.

Release 
In September 2016, Two Tribes teamed up with IndieBox, a monthly subscription box service, to offer a custom-designed, physical version of Rive. This limited collector’s edition included a DRM-free game disc, the official soundtrack on CD, an instruction manual and Steam key, as well as various collectible items. A physical version of Rive was also released for Nintendo Switch on August 2019 titled 'Rive: Ultimate Edition' sold by Super Rare Games. This limited run release includes full interior artwork, game cart, manual and trading cards.

Reception

References

External links
 

2016 video games
Cancelled Wii U games
Engine Software games
Linux games
MacOS games
Nintendo Switch games
Platform games
PlayStation 4 games
Shoot 'em ups
Single-player video games
Video games developed in the Netherlands
Windows games
Xbox One games